Fontenay-aux-Roses is a station on the line B of the Réseau Express Régional, a hybrid suburban commuter and rapid transit line. It is named after the town it is located in, Fontenay-aux-Roses.

References

See also

 List of stations of the Paris RER

Railway stations in France opened in 1892